Jason and the Argonauts (working title: Jason and the Golden Fleece) is a 1963 Anglo-American independent mythological fantasy adventure film distributed by Columbia Pictures. It was produced by Charles H. Schneer, directed by Don Chaffey, and stars Todd Armstrong, while co-starring Nancy Kovack, Honor Blackman, and Gary Raymond.

Shot in Eastman Color, the film was made in collaboration with stop-motion animation master Ray Harryhausen and is known for its various legendary creatures, notably the iconic fight scene featuring seven skeleton warriors. Although it was a box-office disappointment during its initial release, the film was critically acclaimed and later became a cult classic.

The film score was composed by Bernard Herrmann, who had partnered with Harryhausen on The 7th Voyage of Sinbad (1958), The 3 Worlds of Gulliver (1960) and Mysterious Island (1961).

Plot
Pelias usurps the throne of Thessaly, killing King Aristo. A prophecy states that one of Aristo's children will avenge him. The infant Jason, Aristo's son, is spirited away by one of Aristo' soldiers. Pelias slays one of Aristo's daughters after she seeks sanctuary in the temple of the goddess Hera. Because the murder has profaned her temple, Hera becomes Jason's protector. She warns Pelias to beware of "a one-sandaled man".

Twenty years later, Jason saves Pelias from drowning in a river, an "accident" orchestrated by Hera, losing his sandal in the process. Pelias recognizes his enemy. Jason intends to seek the legendary Golden Fleece to rally support against Pelias. The king encourages Jason in the attempt, hoping him to die on the mission.

Hermes takes Jason to Mount Olympus to speak with Zeus and Hera. Zeus decrees that Hera can help him only five times. This is the same number of times that Jason's murdered sister called on her for protection. She directs him to search for the Fleece in the land of Colchis. Zeus offers aid, but Jason declines.

He sets out to build a ship and recruit a crew. Men from all over Greece compete for the honor of joining his quest. Because their ship is named the Argo after its builder, Argus, the crew are dubbed the Argonauts. Among them are Hercules, Hylas, and Acastus, who was secretly sent by his father Pelias to sabotage the voyage.

Hera guides Jason to the Isle of Bronze, warning him to take nothing but provisions. However, Hercules steals a brooch pin the size of a javelin from a building filled with treasure and surmounted by a gigantic bronze statue of Talos. The statue comes to life and attacks the Argonauts. Jason again turns to Hera, who tells him to open a large plug on Talos's heel to release the giant's ichor. Talos falls to the ground, crushing Hylas and hiding his body. Hercules refuses to leave until he ascertains the fate of his friend. The other Argonauts are unwilling to abandon Hercules, so Jason calls upon Hera again. She informs them that Hylas died and that Zeus has other plans for Hercules.

She directs Jason to seek out Phineus, who has been blinded and is tormented by harpies for misusing Zeus's gift of prophesy. After the Argonauts capture and cage the harpies, Phineus tells them how to reach Colchis, by sailing between the Clashing Rocks. He also gives Jason an amulet of the sea god Triton. The Argonauts see another ship trying to pass through the other way, only to be crushed and sunk when the Clashing Rocks smash together. When the Argo tries to row through, the ship appears doomed as well. In despair, Jason throws Phineus's amulet into the water, whereupon Triton rises up and holds the rocks apart long enough for the Argo to pass. Upon clearing the rocks, the Argonauts rescue several survivors from the other ship, including Medea, high priestess of Colchis.

Finally nearing Colchis, Acastus challenges Jason's authority and engages him in a duel. Disarmed, Acastus jumps into the sea and disappears. Jason and his men land and accept an invitation from King Aeëtes to a feast. Unknown to them, Acastus has warned Aeëtes of Jason's quest for the Golden Fleece. Aeëtes has the unwary Argonauts imprisoned, but Medea, having fallen in love with Jason, helps him and his men escape.

Acastus tries to steal the Fleece first, but is killed by its guardian, the Hydra. Jason kills the beast and takes the Fleece. Medea is mortally wounded by an arrow, but Jason heals her with the Fleece. Aeëtes then sows the Hydra's teeth and prays to the goddess Hecate. Seven armed skeletons, the "children of the Hydra's teeth", emerge from the ground. Jason, Phalerus and Castor, hold them off, while Medea and Argus escape back to the Argo with the Fleece. After a prolonged battle, in which his companions are killed, Jason escapes by jumping into the sea. Jason, Medea, and the surviving Argonauts begin their voyage home to Thessaly. On Olympus, Zeus tells Hera that he is not done with Jason.

Cast
 Todd Armstrong as Jason (dubbed by Tim Turner, uncredited)
 Nancy Kovack as Medea (dubbed by Eva Haddon, uncredited)
 Gary Raymond as Acastus
 Laurence Naismith as Argus
 Niall MacGinnis as Zeus
 Michael Gwynn as Hermes/priest
 Douglas Wilmer as Pelias
 Jack Gwillim as King Aeëtes
 Honor Blackman as Hera
 John Cairney as Hylas
 Patrick Troughton as Phineus
 Andrew Faulds as Phalerus
 Nigel Green as Hercules
 John Crawford as Polydeuces (uncredited)
 Ferdinando Poggi as Castor (uncredited)
 Bill Gudgeon as Triton (uncredited)
 Doug Robinson as Eupaemus (uncredited) 
 Davina Taylor as Briseis (uncredited)
 Aldo Cristiani as Lynceus (uncredited)

Production

Film score
The film is one of the mythically-themed fantasies scored by Bernard Herrmann. Apart from being the composer's fourth collaboration with Ray Harryhausen (The 7th Voyage of Sinbad, The 3 Worlds of Gulliver, and Mysterious Island, made in 1958, 1960, and 1961 respectively), Herrmann also scored the science fiction films The Day the Earth Stood Still (1951) and Journey to the Center of the Earth (1959).

Contrasting with Herrmann's all-string score for Psycho, the film's soundtrack was made without a string section. This leaves the brass and percussion to perform the heroic fanfares, and the woodwinds along with additional instruments (such as the harp) to dominate in the more subtle and romantic parts.

In 1995, Intrada released a re-recording of the original score. The new version was conducted by American composer/conductor Bruce Broughton, and performed by the Sinfonia of London.

Differences from classical mythology

The film differs in some ways from the traditional telling in Greek mythology:
 Pelias does not kill his half-brother King Aristo (Aeson) but instead had him imprisoned. Eventually, it is Medea, and not Jason, who kills Pelias; she demonstrates to Pelias' daughters that she can rejuvenate an old ram into a young one by killing, chopping and boiling it in a pot. She promises to do the same for Pelias, so his daughters kill and chop him. However, Medea breaks her word and Pelias remains dead.
 Hera does not attempt to kill Pelias herself by drowning him in the river Anavros. Instead, in order to prove Jason's virtuous heart to Zeus, she disguises herself as an old woman unable to cross on her own. Jason, feeling sympathy for the lady, ferries her across on his back but loses a sandal into its depths.
 In mythology, the Argonauts encountered Talos on their return journey after they had obtained the Golden Fleece. He was defeated not by Jason, but by Medea casting a spell on Talos, causing him to remove the bronze nail from his ankle which kept the ichor inside. The mythological Talos guarded Crete, not the "Isle of Bronze", and was protecting not a treasure, but Queen Europa.
 In the film, Hylas was killed when the crumbling remains of Talos crushed him. However, in mythology, Hylas was actually kidnapped by a naiad who fell in love with him as he took a drink from a spring. When Hercules could not find him, he believed him to still be alive, and stayed behind on the island to look for him (as in the film).
 The harpies were not caught in a net or caged, but were chased away by the Boreads: Calaïs and Zetes (also Zethes)
 In the film, the god Triton saved the Argo from destruction passing through the Clashing Rocks: however; according to Apollonius of Rhodes, Phineus instructed Jason to release a dove and if the bird makes it through, row with all their might and the goddess Athena provided the extra push to the ship needed to clear them; "the Argo darted from the rocks like a flying arrow". Another source is Homer's Odyssey, in which Circe tells Odysseus: "One ship alone, one deep-sea craft sailed clear, the Argo, sung by the world, when heading home from Aeëtes shores. And she would have crashed against those giant rocks and sunk at once if Hera, for her love of Jason, had not sped her through".
 Jason was not betrayed by Acastus in the classical tale. Jason openly told King Aeëtes that he had come for the Fleece. The king promised Jason could have it if he performed three tasks, knowing full well they were impossible. However, Jason was able to complete the tasks with the help of Medea. It was not the Hydra that protected the Fleece but rather a dragon. Jason did not slay it, but instead, Medea cast a spell on it, causing it to fall asleep. Jason sowed the dragon's teeth into the ground, not Aeëtes. Jason defeated the "dragon's offspring" (the spartoi) by making them fight among themselves and destroy each other, rather than battling them with his colleagues.
 One of the two Argonauts killed by the skeletons is Castor, who in Greek mythology would perish much later as the result of a feud with Idas and Lynceus. The other is Phalerus, who in mythology would also survive the adventures of the Argonauts.
 The film ultimately omits the story of Medea killing and butchering her own brother, Absyrtus, to help Jason and the Argonauts escape; and also the episodes with Cyzicus, the Gegeines and the Argonauts' stay on the isle of Lemnos.

Reception

Critical response
The film received critical acclaim and is now considered a classic. On review aggregator Rotten Tomatoes, the film holds a "Certified Fresh" approval rating of 89% based on 45 reviews, with an average rating of 7.5/10. The website's critical consensus reads, "Don Chaffey's Jason and the Argonauts is an outlandish, transportive piece of nostalgia whose real star is the masterful stop-motion animation work of Ray Harryhausen." On Metacritic, the film received a score of 69 based on 10 reviews, indicating "generally favorable reviews".

Variety magazine wrote: "The $3 million film has a workable scenario and has been directed resourcefully and spiritedly by Don Chaffey, under whose leadership a colorful cast performs with zeal".

Ray Harryhausen regarded the film as his best. Previous Harryhausen films had been generally shown as part of double features in "B" theatres. Columbia was able to book it as a single feature in many "A" theatres in the United States.

Accolades
At the 1992 Academy Awards, in honoring Ray Harryhausen with a lifetime-achievement award, actor Tom Hanks remarked: "Some people say Casablanca or Citizen Kane. I say Jason and the Argonauts is the greatest film ever made".

In 2008, the American Film Institute nominated the film for its Top 10 Fantasy Films list.

In April 2004, Empire magazine ranked Talos as the second-best film monster of all time, after King Kong.

Home media
Columbia released the film on Blu-ray (for regions A, B, and C) on 6 July 2010. The disc's special features include two new audio commentaries, one by Peter Jackson and Randall William Cook, and the other by Harryhausen in conversation with his biographer Tony Dalton.

Comic book adaptation
The five-issue comic book miniseries Jason and the Argonauts: The Kingdom of Hades (2007) from TidalWave Productions' Ray Harryhausen Signature Series, continued the story. It was followed by Jason and the Argonauts: Final Chorus (2014).

 Dell Movie Classic: Jason and the Argonauts (August–October 1963)

See also
 Jason and the Argonauts (2000 miniseries)
 List of stop-motion films
 Sword-and-sandal
 Greek mythology in popular culture

References

External links

 
 
 
 
 This film on archive.org

1963 films
1960s fantasy adventure films
American fantasy adventure films
1960s English-language films
Films about the Argonauts
Films scored by Bernard Herrmann
American epic films
Films directed by Don Chaffey
Films set in ancient Greece
Films set in the Mediterranean Sea
Films using stop-motion animation
Columbia Pictures films
Epic fantasy films
Films adapted into comics
Films set on ships
Films about Heracles
Cultural depictions of Harpies
Works based on the Argonautica
Films produced by Charles H. Schneer
Films with screenplays by Beverley Cross
1960s American films